The Nürburgring Nordschleife is a motor racing circuit in Germany. The adjacent modern Nürburgring Grand Prix track was opened in 1984. The two tracks can host events independently, or they can be combined, e.g. for the 24 Hours Nürburgring.

An even longer approx.  combined track that included the  Südschleife was seldom used for major races since the 1930s. This shorter southern circuit was not modernized in the 1970s and was sacrificed for the 1980s construction of the modern track, as were the old pit facilities, the Südkehre (southern turn) and the straight behind the pits which were used in an original Nordschleife lap.

1927-1939 Original track 

In the three German Grand Prix that were contested there in the late 1920s, 18 laps resp.  distance had to be covered. The Eifelrennen events soon moved to the much shorter Südschleife.

After the 1930 German GP (and again the 1933 round) had been cancelled due to the great depression, major racing resumed with the 1931 German Grand Prix which from now on took place only on the Nordschleife. Its track length of  remained unchanged until 1966. The track surface was altered and improved, with the ditch inside the Karussell being altered to a concrete banking as drivers like Caracciola used to put their inside wheels in there for extra grip. Also, the Nürburgring in the Eifel mountains became notorious for frequent bad weather, and due to its length with lap times of 10 minutes, conditions could change significantly in the meantime. Probably due to this, it took four years between Nuvolari beating the 11 minutes barrier in 1932, and Rosemeyer breaking the 10 minutes in the 1936 GP after several pilots came close in practice.

From 1938 on, rules limited the capacity to 3 litres supercharged, but 480 hp and better handling equalized the disadvantage. Smaller Voiturettes with 1500cc were favored by the Non-Germans, and Mercedes had already built their W165 which proved able to win in this class, too. The new rules were expected to take effect in 1941, but the war changed the rules even more drastically.

1951-1966 Classic Green Hell 
The war and subsequent ill-treatment had damaged the track and the facilities. After 20 years, the track was now lined with tall hedges and trees, and thus was later baptized Green Hell. Smaller races resumed in the late forties, but Germans and Germany remained excluded from major sports events until 1951. The pre-war voiturette rule set for supercharged 1500cc engines (or 4500cc normal) had basically been made the Formula One in the 1940s.

In 1951, major international racing returned to the Ring, but even though the Alfas had also about 400 hp, they failed to eclipse the pre-war records set by Lang, who raced again for Mercedes in 1952 and 1954. Two rule changes brought less powerful machinery, and the Le Mans disaster in 1955 led to the cancellation of many GPs in that year, including the German. By 1956, the old records were finally beaten. Single seater open wheel Grand Prix cars soon came close to 9 minutes and 150 km/h. Also, sports car events emerged in the 1950s, as did touring car racing in the 1960s. The Ring saw two more years without F1 races, as Berlin's AVUS had been chosen for 1959, and in 1960, the German Grand Prix was run on the Südschleife to F2 rules which would become F1 rules in 1961. After three years of progress, including a revival of the mid-engine layout pioneered by Auto Union, the 9 minutes barrier was easily beaten despite small 1500cc engines with less than 200 hp, similar to the power of cars three decades earlier.

1967-1970 Chicane added 
The Hohenrain chicane (and 25 meters extra, now ) was added in early 1967 to lower entrance speed to the Start/Finish straight and the pitlane. Lap times were affected only initially, as technical progress, especially aerodynamic aids, made the cars significantly faster in the years to follow.

Due to safety concerns, the Formula One drivers on short notice forced a move of the 1970 German Grand Prix to the Hockenheimring. To meet drivers demands, construction works at the Nürburgring started in fall of 1970. Despite the official track length remaining the same, this altered the character of the track and its surroundings significantly.

1971-1982 Rebuilt Nordschleife
By early 1971, the Nordschleife track had been resurfaced, several bumps and jumps (e. g. Brünnchen) had been removed, and the hedges had been replaced by Armco barriers. As a result, the track became even faster, with sportscars setting new track records before Formula One returned. The Südschleife was not updated and abandoned after 1971. Formula One held its last Grand Prix on the Nordschleife in 1976, the last Motorcycle Grand Prix there was in 1980. Due to aerodynamic advance, Formula Two in  almost equalled the record set by Formula One in 1975, and even turbo-powered touring cars came very close.

As Grand Prix racing had not returned to the Ring after 1976 (Formula One) and 1980 (motorcycles), it was decided to build a new track. In late 1982, after the 24 Hours race, the start/finish loop with the pit facilities section was destroyed, putting an end to the classic 22.8 km layout.

1983 (and later) Nordschleife only 

With the old start/finish loop and pit facilities having been destroyed, a short bypass with improvised pit facilities was added to allow racing in 1983 while the new track was under construction, to be ready in 1984. Thus, this stop-gap  Nordschleife-only variant was used by International motorsport sanctioning bodies only in 1983. While Formula Two, World Sportscars and the ETCC competed here, allowing comparison to 1982, DRM and Interserie remained absent, with the DRM having by now switched to Group C sportscars. The 24 Hour race was not held either, as the pits could not accommodate over 100 cars for 24 hours.

Since, this version is used by national events even while other events take place on the adjacent Grand Prix track. The Time Trial Challenge CHC / RCN / BMW-DEC is done on half a dozen Saturday afternoons, with race cars over 15 laps in total, of which 9 are flat out, and the others have to be done within a given time frame, as warm up lap, pit stop laps, and cool down lap. The GLP Regularity Test on Saturday morning is no racing series, with road legal cars having to cover 12 laps in a constant lap time of their choice, between 10 and 15 minutes. Top ten finishers achieve less than 1/10 second difference per lap.

1984-2002 Combined variants (VLN & 24h)
The VLN series of touring car endurance races was founded in 1977. The long track and the large modern Grand Prix track pit facilities can
accommodate up to 230 cars. Usually, VLN races use the short sprint version (Sprintstrecke) of the GP track, taking the Kurzanbindung short cut U-turn on the bridge over the B 258 road, thus bypassing the 1.5 km long section down to Dunlop Kehre. This reduces the number of track workers and adds one or two extra laps of the Nordschleife in the course of a 4h race. In 24h races, the full layout was used.

Variants
  without GP track, used by VLN in early 2000 due to construction of new pit lane facilities, no significant times as all races were in wet condition
  without GP track, used by VLN in the first two races of 2002 while the new Mercedes Arena was built. The Coca-Cola curve was included, driven in opposite direction, to allow the use of the GP track pitlane and timing facilities
  short GP track without Dunlop section (with Castrol-S, 1984–2002)
  full GP track with Dunlop section (with Castrol-S, 1984–2002)

2002-present Combined variants (VLN & 24h)

In early 2002, the former Castrol S chicane was replaced by the tight Ω-shaped Mercedes Arena. This added 586 metres and about 20-25 seconds to lap times, and also lowered average speeds by about 4% or 6 km/h.

As the 24h Nürburgring weekend includes various supporting races, the organizers use parts of the track as additional paddock area. In 2004, the VLN track variant was used, and the Dunlop section was used as paddock area, but access to the actual pits was impractical. Since 2005, the adjacent Mercedes Arena serves as extra paddock area, and is bypassed by a new, tight Castrol-Z chicane which resembles the old Castrol-S chicane. The track length is reduced by 569m, or, compared to the layout used until 2001, prolonged by c. 20m.

  short layout without Dunlop section, without Mercedes Arena via Castrol-Z chicane, not yet used
  short layout without Dunlop section, with Mercedes Arena, from April 2002. The official track length was since changed twice without explanation. As the VLN uses the S-shaped motorcycle version of the NKG chicane, it is not affected by changes to the layout of the tight Z-shaped version used by Formula 1
  short layout from 20 April 2002 to 12 May 2007
  first given for the 2004 24h then used in VLN since 26 May 2007
  since 2008 VLN season
  long layout with Dunlop section, without Mercedes Arena via Castrol-Z chicane, used in 24h since 2005 
  maximum layout with Dunlop section, with Mercedes Arena, used in the 2002-2003 24 Hours, and 2003 VLN Eifelrennen.

2007 BMW F1 demonstration laps

After the VLN 4h endurance race of 28 April 2007 which hosted also a BMW publicity day for fans,  Nick Heidfeld drove a BMW Sauber F1.06 Formula One car around the Nordschleife and short GP-track, as used in VLN races, with a track length of 24.433 km (thus comparison with 1970s times is difficult). For safety reasons, BMW had announced that the car was slowed with hard demonstration tires, maximum ride height, and 275 km/h top speed limited by the transmission. Heidfeld drove three laps on the combined Nordschleife, slowing down once in each lap when passing a camera car.

The official lap time released by BMW Sauber was declared to be 8:34, thus slower than the 8:17 of the pole-setting Porsche. The German press duly reported this lap time, yet criticized BMW. In each lap, Heidfeld had slowed down once to pose for a slow video truck, at Schwedenkreuz on the first lap 1, Kesselchen in lap 2, and Döttinger Höhe in the last lap. The two time spans in between the three passes of Heidfeld were clocked by some fans around the track, first Wehrseifen to Wehrseifen in about 7:28, then 7:31 from Klostertal to Klostertal, which was over 40 seconds quicker than the pole-setting Porsche 996 GT3 RSR. In the 2007 GP, the fastest lap was barely faster, 199 km/h. Fans who respect the official record of the late Stefan Bellof settle for an "estimated 6:12".

Road & Track magazine reported Heidfeld's lap was a 5:57 or 5:58 (for the Nordschleife only), however their times were generated by measuring the speed in some corners, and then calculating a lap time, and not timing a full lap. Heidfeld has since expressed his desire to repeat the experience with less restriction, as well as for a participation in the 24h race.

Motorcycles
 

Due to safety reasons, motorcycle races moved to the modern track since 1984. Similar to the Isle of Man TT, amateur enthusiasts continued to compete on the old track in endurance events. In the 1990s, only the so-called Zuverlässigkeitsfahrt (Zuvi, reliability run) series remained, for amateurs on road legal stock bikes. The events consisted mostly of regularity laps, also on other race tracks like Hockenheimring, with a short time trial. On the Nordschleife, after a reliability run with road legal bikes and tyres, a single lap time trial from standing start covered an incomplete lap of about 20.7 km. As the event was discontinued after 1994 in which Dähne's time was not beaten, his 1993 time remains the fastest officially timed motorcycle lap ever on the 20.832 m variant.

Dähne set the first of his record there in August 1988 with a Suzuki GSX-R at 7:55.07. Then, with a 750cc Honda RC30 VFR750R, he subsequently lowered it to 7:53.08 in July 1990, to 7:50.71 in June 1992, and on 23 May 1993, using Metzeler ME Z1 tyres, set yet another record, with 7:49.71. After the 1993 event, an onboard-video was produced in which Dähne did another lap, about 10 secs slower, carrying camera equipment on his back.

See also
List of Nürburgring Nordschleife lap times

References

External links

 adac.24h-rennen.de: 24h race result database (since 2001) 
 vln.de: Former champions and results 
 r-c-n.com: Statistik: CHC Rundenrekorde Nordschleife 1990 - 2008
 20832.com: Database with lap times of racing events and magazine tests
 formula1.com German Grand Prix

Motorsport in Germany